Saint Michael's Cathedral (Собор святого Архистратига Михаила) in Izhevsk rivals the older Alexander Nevsky Cathedral as the main Orthodox church of Udmurtia in Russia.

Its Russian Revival design belongs to Ivan Charushin, a little-known 19th-century architect from Vyatka. The red-brick church is capped with a tent-like roof that rises to a height of 67 metres. It is encircled by several massive chapels with gilded bulbous domes and slender candle-like belfries. The porches have sharply pitched roofs in the manner of the Muscovite churches of the 17th century. 

The Izhevsk arms factory owed its rise partly to the involvement of Grand Duke Mikhail Pavlovich, whose patron saint was Michael the Archangel. The factory's employees contributed one percent of their wages to a fund set up to finance the construction of a large church to this military saint. 

The cathedral was erected between 1897 and 1915, only to be demolished by the Soviets in 1937. It was rebuilt to Charushin's original designs in 2004–2007.

References

External links

Izhevsk
Russian Orthodox cathedrals in Russia
Russian Revival architecture
Churches completed in 1915
19th-century Eastern Orthodox church buildings
Demolished churches in the Soviet Union
Buildings and structures demolished in 1937
Rebuilt churches in Russia
21st-century Eastern Orthodox church buildings
Churches completed in 2007
Buildings and structures in Udmurtia
Tourist attractions in Udmurtia
21st-century churches in Russia
Cultural heritage monuments in Udmurtia
Objects of cultural heritage of Russia of regional significance